Creal Reef Light is an active lighthouse located at Creal Reef, a planar reef about  east of Mackay, Queensland, Australia. It guides ships outgoing from Mackay into Hydrographers Passage, a deep water channel east of Mackay. The structure is a stainless steel tower, which also serves as a daymark and carries a racon.

Creal Reef

It was named in the late 1920s by Captain John A. Edgell (RN) on the survey ship HMAS Moresby, during the Moresby survey of the Cumberland Channel inside the Great Barrier Reef. It was named after Denis A. J. Creal, a pilot with the No. 101 Flight RAAF who assisted the Moresby with her surveys.

Structure and display
The structure, established in April 1985, is a  stainless steel skeletal tower with a white lantern, standing on a reinforced concrete hut, supported on four piles. The light shares the location with an automatic weather station.

The apparatus is a solar powered VRB-25 rotating at 1.33 rpm. The light source is a 12 Volt 75 Watt Halogen lamp with an intensity of 104,000 cd.

Site operation and visiting
The site and the tower are operated by the Australian Maritime Safety Authority. The island is accessible only by boat, and both the site and the tower are closed to the public.

See also

 List of lighthouses in Australia

References

External links

Lighthouses completed in 1985
Lighthouses in Queensland
Buildings and structures in North Queensland
1985 establishments in Australia